The Sentinel News is a local newspaper in the Hout Bay region of Cape Town, Western Cape, South Africa.

The Sentinel was established in 1960. In 2010 they celebrated their 50th anniversary, marking it with a special edition.

External links
 

Weekly newspapers published in South Africa
Mass media in Cape Town
Publications with year of establishment missing
1960 establishments in South Africa
Publications established in 1960